The Jezero Hall is an indoor sporting arena located in Kragujevac, Serbia. The capacity of the arena is 5,320 people. It is currently home to the Radnički Kragujevac basketball, volleyball teams and KMF Ekonomac Kragujevac

The first sporting event in the venue took place on 20 October 1978 with a basketball match between KK Radnički Kragujevac and KK Jugoplastika Split.

See also
List of indoor arenas in Serbia
Kragujevac

References 

Indoor arenas in Serbia
Basketball venues in Serbia
Sport in Kragujevac
KK Radnički Kragujevac